Nicolson Calvert (c. 1724 – 4 May 1793) was an English politician.

He was the oldest surviving son of Felix Calvert of Furneaux Pelham in Hertfordshire.  His mother Christian was the daughter of Josiah Nicolson, a brewer from Clapham. He was educated at Bury St Edmunds Grammar School and at Trinity College, Cambridge.

He owned Hunsdon House in Hertfordshire, which he inherited from his grandfather Felix Calvert.

He was a Member of Parliament (MP) for the borough of Tewkesbury from 1754 to 1774.

He married Rebecca, the daughter of the Rev. John Goodwin, rector of Clapham, Surrey, but had no children. They lived at Hunsdon House, which his widow rebuilt after his death.

References 

1720s births
Year of birth uncertain
1793 deaths
People educated at King Edward VI School, Bury St Edmunds
Alumni of Trinity College, Cambridge
People from Furneux Pelham
Members of the Parliament of Great Britain for Tewkesbury
British MPs 1754–1761
British MPs 1761–1768
British MPs 1768–1774